Edenvale Commando was a light infantry regiment of the South African Army. It formed part of the South African Army Infantry Formation as well as the South African Territorial Reserve.

History

Origin

Operations

With the SADF
During this era, the unit was mainly engaged in area force protection, search and cordones as well as other assistance to the local police.

The unit resorted under the command of Group 41.

With the SANDF

Disbandment
This unit, along with all other Commando units was disbanded after a decision by South African President Thabo Mbeki to disband all Commando Units. The Commando system was phased out between 2003 and 2008 "because of the role it played in the apartheid era", according to the Minister of Safety and Security Charles Nqakula.

By 2013, the derelict Rietfontein Commando base had fallen into a state of decay, raising many concerns by local residents and business owners. Also known as the Edenvale Commando/Barracks, the building, together with the current Sebenza Police Station, used to house a wing of the South African Defence Force. A report requested the municipality for permission to demolish the building and sell the land by public tender.

Leadership

Insignia

Dress Insignia

References

See also 
 South African Commando System

Infantry regiments of South Africa
Disbanded military units and formations in Germiston
South African Commando Units